The 2018–19 EHF Challenge Cup was the 22nd edition of the European Handball Federation's third-tier competition for men's handball clubs, running from 6 October 2018 to 19 May 2019.

Overview

Team allocation

Round and draw dates 
All draws will be held at the European Handball Federation headquarters in Vienna, Austria.

Round 2 
Teams listed first played the first leg at home. Some teams agreed to play both matches in the same venue.
The first legs were played on 6–7 October and the second legs were played on 13–14 October 2018.

|}
Notes

1 Both legs were hosted by Livingston HC.
2 Both legs were hosted by RK Borac m:tel.
3 Both legs were hosted by Masheka Mogilev.
4 Both legs were hosted by HC Kauno Azuolas-KTU.
5 Both legs were hosted by Celtnieks Riga.
6 Both legs were hosted by EHC Tournai.
7 Both legs were hosted by HB Dudelange.
8 Both legs were hosted by HC Dicken.
9 Both legs were hosted by Bregenz Handball.
10 Both legs were hosted by Dynamo-Victor.
11 Both legs were hosted by HV Hurry-Up.
12 Both legs were hosted by Pallamano Pressano.
13 Both legs were hosted by KHF Prishtina.
14 Both legs were hosted by KH Kastrioti.

Round 3 
Teams listed first played the first leg at home. Some teams agreed to play both matches in the same venue. The first legs were played on 17–18 November and the second legs were played on 24–25 November 2018

|}
Notes

1 Both legs were hosted by HC Neva SPb.
2 Both legs were hosted by HC Berchem.
3 Both legs were hosted by Masheka Mogilev.
4 Both legs were hosted by HC Dukla Prague.
5 Both legs were hosted by Donbass.
6 Both legs were hosted by Ramat HaSharon HC.
7 Both legs were hosted by CSM București.

Last 16 

The draw seeding pots for the Last 16 Knockout round were composed as follows:

The draw for the last 16 round was held on 27 November 2018.
The first leg was scheduled for 9–10 February, while the second leg followed on 16–17 February 2019.Some teams agreed to play both matches in the same venue.

|}

Notes

1 Both legs were hosted by Madeira Andebol SAD.
2 Both legs were hosted by HC Berchem.

Matches

HC Dicken won 56–50 on aggregate.

HC Neva SPb won 56–45 on aggregate.

A.E.K. Athens won 69–53 on aggregate.

Dinamo Viktor Stavropol won 53–49 on aggregate.

CSM București won 58–48 on aggregate.

RK Borac m:tel won 52–38 on aggregate.

HC Visé BM won 68–65 on aggregate.

Madeira Andebol SAD won 60–47 on aggregate.

Quarterfinals 
The draw event was held at the EHF Office in Vienna on Tuesday 19 February 2019. The draw determined the quarter-final and also the semi-final pairings. Teams listed first will play the first leg at home. For the quarter-finals, there was no seeding as all eight teams were drawn from the same pot one after another. There was also no country protection applied in the draw. The semi-final draw followed using the quarter-final pairings.

The first quarter-final leg is scheduled for 23–24 March, while the second leg will follow on 30–31 March 2019.

|}

Matches

A.E.K. Athens won 51–49 on aggregate.

CSM București won 54–42 on aggregate.

Madeira Andebol SAD won 54–53 on aggregate.

HC Neva SPb won 74–45 on aggregate.

Semifinals 

The first semi-final legs was scheduled for 20–21 April 2019, while the second legs followed on 27–28 April 2019.

|}

Matches

CSM București won 51–44 on aggregate.

Madeira Andebol SAD won 57–44 on aggregate.

Final 

The first leg was played on 11–12 May and the second was played on 18–19 May 2019. The final home rights draw was held on 30 April 2019 in Vienna.

|}

Matches

CSM București won 48–42 on aggregate.

Top goalscorers

See also 
 2018–19 EHF Champions League
 2018–19 EHF Cup
 2018–19 Women's EHF Cup
 2018–19 Women's EHF Challenge Cup

References

External links 
 EHF Challenge Cup (official website)

Challenge Cup
Challenge Cup
EHF Challenge Cup